Jukebox Ella: The Complete Verve Singles, Vol. 1 is a 2003 compilation album by the American jazz singer Ella Fitzgerald. The album contains all the singles Fitzgerald recorded for Verve Records label between 1956 and 1965.

A second volume was announced for release in Fall 2004, but has failed to materialize and is believed canceled.

Track listing
For the 2003 Verve CD Issue, 000009202

Disc One
 "Stay There" (Donald Kahn, Stanley Styne) – 2:35
 "The Sun Forgot to Shine This Morning" (Bill Carey, Gene Howard) – 3:17
 "Too Young for the Blues" (Biff Jones, Charles Meyer) – 3:16
 "It's Only a Man" (Hal Borne, Paul Francis Webster) – 3:27
 "Beale Street Blues" (W. C. Handy) – 2:27
 "(The End of) A Beautiful Friendship" (Kahn, Styne) – 2:37
 "The Silent Treatment" (Kahn, Styne) – 2:51
 "Hear My Heart" (Buddy Lester) – 2:19
 "Hotta Chocolatta" (Milton Drake, Victor Mizzy) – 3:08
 "A-Tisket, A-Tasket" (Van Alexander, Ella Fitzgerald) – 2:20
 "Teach Me How to Cry" (Phil Tuminello) – 2:58
 "Swingin' Shepherd Blues" (Kenny Jacobson, Moe Koffman, Rhoda Roberts) – 2:41
 "Your Red Wagon" (Gene DePaul, Richard M. Jones, Don Raye) – 2:56
 "Trav'lin' Light" (Johnny Mercer, Jimmy Mundy, Trummy Young) – 3:12
 "Oh, What a Night for Love" (Steve Allen, Neal Hefti) – 2:24
 "Dreams Are Made for Children" (Mack David, Jerry Livingston, Max Meth) – 2:38
 "But Not for Me" (George Gershwin, Ira Gershwin) – 2:05
 "The Christmas Song" (Mel Tormé, Robert Wells) – 3:18
Disc Two
 "The Secret of Christmas" (Sammy Cahn, Jimmy Van Heusen) – 2:47
 Medley: "We Three Kings Of Orient Are", "O Little Town of Bethlehem" (Bishop Phillips Brooks, John Henry Hopkins Jr., Lewis H. Redner) – 3:36
 "You're Driving Me Crazy" ("Ich Fuhle Mich Crazy") (Walter Donaldson, Gilbert Obermair) – 3:07
 "(If You Can't Sing It) You'll Have to Swing It (Mr. Paganini)" (Sam Coslow) – 3:46
 "Call Me Darling" (Dorothy Dick, Mort Fryberg, Rolf Marbet, Bert Reisfeld) – 2:35
 "Bill Bailey, Won't You Come Home?" (Hughie Cannon) – 3:24
 "Ol' Man Mose" (Louis Armstrong, Zilner Randolph) – 3:53
 "Desafinado (Off Key)" (Jesse Cavanaugh, Jon Hendricks, Antonio Carlos Jobim, Newton Mendonça) – 2:11
 "Stardust" (Hoagy Carmichael, Mitchell Parish) – 2:32
 "All the Live Long Day" (G. Gershwin, I. Gershwin) – 2:41
 "I'm a Poached Egg (Without Toast)" (G. Gershwin, I. Gershwin) – 2:35
 "Ringo Beat" (Fitzgerald) – 1:48
 "I'm Fallin' in Love" (Barney Kessel) – 2:36
 "She's Just a Quiet Girl" (Riziero Ortolani, Paul Vance) – 2:53
 "We Three (My Echo, My Shadow and Me)" (Nelson Cogane, Sammy Mysels, Dick Robertson) – 2:38
 "The Shadow of Your Smile" (Johnny Mandel, Webster) – 3:06
 "A Place for Lovers" (Manuel DeSica, Norman Gimbel) – 2:41
 "Lonely Is" (Clint Ballard Jr., Hal Hackaday) – 3:33

Personnel 
Recorded from 1956–1965, in Hollywood, Los Angeles: 
Information taken from Barnes&Noble 

 
 Ella Fitzgerald – vocals
 Bob Cooper – Clarinet, Tenor saxophone
 Harry Edison – Trumpet
 Maynard Ferguson – Trumpet
 Herb Geller – Clarinet, Alto saxophone
 Bill Holman – Tenor saxophone
 Dick Hyman – Organ
 Gordon Jenkins – Conductor, Arranger
 Barney Kessel – Guitar, Conductor, Arranger
 Mel Lewis – Drums
 Ted Nash – Clarinet, Flute, Tenor saxophone
 Bud Shank – Flute, Alto saxophone
 Ben Webster – Tenor saxophone
 Pete Candoli – Trumpet
 Bob Enevoldsen – Tenor saxophone, Valve trombone
 Mort Herbert – Violin
 Ronnie Lang – Alto saxophone
 Stan Levey – Drums
 Lou Levy – Piano, Celesta
 Ray Linn – Trumpet
 Matty Matlock – Flute
 Arnold Ross – Piano
 Jimmy Woode – Bass
 Buddy Bregman – Conductor
 Corky Hale – Harp
 Frank De Vol – Conductor, Arranger
 Felix Slatkin – Violin
 Ralph Carmichael – Conductor
 Med Flory – Baritone saxophone
 Al Porcino – Trumpet
 Victor Arno – Violin
 Israel Baker – Violin
 Robert Barene – Violin
 Max Bennett – Bass
 Milt Bernhart – Trombone
 Larry Bunker – Percussion
 Joe Comfort – Bass
 Conrad Gozzo – Trumpet
 James A. Decker – French horn
 Harold Dicterow – Violin
 Alvin Dinkin – Viola
 Don Fagerquist – Trumpet
 David Frisina – Violin
 Russ Garcia – Conductor
 Chuck Gentry – Bass clarinet, Baritone saxophone
 Edward Gilbert – Tuba
 Benny Gill – Violin
 Jewell L. Grant – Woodwinds
 William Green – Woodwinds
 Skeets Herfurt – Woodwinds
 Norm Herzberg – Bassoon
 Milt Holland – Percussion
 Jules Jacob – Woodwinds
 Gus Johnson – Drums
 Knud Jorgensen – Piano
 Kathyrine Julye – Harp
 Anatol Kaminsky – Violin
 Armand Karpoff – Cello
 John Kitzmiller – Tuba
 Joe Koch – Woodwinds
 Raphael Kramer – Cello
 Dan Lube – Violin
 Alfred Lustgarten – Violin
 Edgar Lustgarten – Cello
 Virginia Majewski – Viola
 Joe Mondragon – Bass
 Jack Marsh – Bassoon
 Marty Paich – Conductor, Arranger
 Wilfred Middlebrooks – Bass
 Dick Nash – Trombone
 George Neikrug – Cello
 Nelson Riddle – Conductor, Arranger
 Erno Neufeld – Violin
 Robert Ostrowsky – Viola
 Lou Raderman – Violin
 Dorothy Remsen – Harp
 George Roberts – Bass trombone
 Paul Robyn – Viola
 Nathan Ross – Violin
 William Schiopffe – Drums
 Wilbur Schwartz – Woodwinds
 Paul Shure – Violin
 Alvin Stoller – Drums
 Fred Stulce – Flute
 Milton Thomas – Viola
 Lloyd Ulyate – Trombone
 Champ Webb – Woodwinds
 Paul Weston – Conductor, Arranger
 Vincent DeRosa – French Horn
 Alex Beller – Violin
 Eleanor Slatkin – Cello
 Victor Bay – Violin
 David Filerman – Cello
 Bert Gassman – Woodwinds
 Stanley Harris – Viola
 Jan Hlinka – Viola
 Murray Kellner – Violin
 Sylvia Ruderman – Flute
 Clint Neagley – Alto Saxophone
 Albert Saparoff – Violin
 Justin DiTullio – Cello
 Arnold Koblentz – Woodwinds
 Abe Luboff – Bass
 Nino Rosso – Cello
 Karl de Karske – Bass trombone
 Sam Freed – Violin
 Leonard Hartman – Flute
 Martin Ruderman – Flute
 Ambrose Russo – Violin
 George Werth – Trumpet
 Tommy Pederson – Trombone
 Joe Howard – Trombone
 Maurice Stein – Alto sSaxophone
 Elizabeth Greenschpoon – Cello
 Sanford Schonbach – Viola
 Gordon Schoneberg – Oboe
 Misha Russel – Concertmaster
 Bill Miller – Violin
 Kenneth Lowman – Bassoon
 Ernest Romersa – Woodwinds
 Philip Stephens – Bass
 Paul Smith – Piano
 Sam Albert – Violin
 Francis "Frenchie" Concepcion – Cello
 G.R. Henhenninck – Viola
 Henry Hill – Violin
 Buddy Bregman – Arranger
 Ellen Fitton – Mastering
 Hollis King – Art Direction
 Bryan Koniarz – Producer
 Ken Druker – Executive producer
 Stuart Nicholson – Liner notes
 Stephanie Stein Crease – Notes editing
 Miguel Villalobos – Illustrations

References

2003 compilation albums
Ella Fitzgerald albums
Verve Records compilation albums